Hawkesbury is an electoral district of the Legislative Assembly in the Australian state of New South Wales. It is represented by Robyn Preston of the Liberal Party.

It includes all of the City of Hawkesbury and the far north of both The Hills Shire and Hornsby Shire.

History
Hawkesbury was originally created in 1859, replacing part of Cumberland (North Riding) and named after the Hawkesbury River.  It elected two members simultaneously from 1859 to 1880.  It was abolished in 1920, with the introduction of proportional representation and absorbed into Cumberland.  It was recreated in 1927.

Hawkesbury is a conservative seat, having been won by the main centre-right party at every election since 1947. At the Liberal Party landslide victory in 2011, Liberal candidate Ray Williams achieved 84.7% of the two-party preferred vote, with a primary vote share of 75.4%.

Members for Hawkesbury

Election results

References

Hawkesbury